The canton of Damigny is an administrative division of the Orne department, northwestern France. It was created at the French canton reorganisation which came into effect in March 2015. Its seat is in Damigny.

It consists of the following communes:
 
Colombiers
Condé-sur-Sarthe
Cuissai
Damigny
La Ferrière-Bochard
Gandelain
Héloup
Lalacelle
Lonrai
Mieuxcé
Pacé
La Roche-Mabile
Saint-Céneri-le-Gérei
Saint-Denis-sur-Sarthon
Saint-Nicolas-des-Bois
Valframbert

References

Cantons of Orne